The barn spider (Araneus cavaticus) is a common orb-weaver spider native to North America. They are around three-quarters of an inch (20 mm) in length and are usually yellow and brown in color. They often construct their webs in wooden human structures, hence their common name. The species is notable for being the basis for the character Charlotte in the book Charlotte's Web by American writer E. B. White.

Description
Barn spiders are predominantly yellow and brown in coloration with striped legs. Their undersides are typically black with white marks inside, although color ranges can be quite variable. They are about three-quarters of an inch (20 mm) long but can grow up to and above an inch (25 mm) long with large, round abdomens.

Ecology and behavior
Barn spiders are nocturnal. Like many other species of orb weavers, they take their webs down during daytime and build another every evening, consuming the silk from the previous web to conserve their resources. Their "orb" webs are constructed archetypically, with symmetrical spokes connected by a spiral inside. They hide during the day and at night  sit in the middle of the web and wait for an insect to land on the web.

These spiders may or may not have a venomous bite. Their venom is considered non-toxic to most humans on the level of any other non-toxic insect bite.
These spiders are aggressive toward each other.  They attack each other if in close quarters, though many may inhabit the same structure or area at any given time.   They are most commonly found in rafters and wooden structures in suburban and rural structures or areas, and on boats near lakes, thus getting their name, "barn spider".

When agitated (by a puff of air, for instance), these spiders sometimes bounce up and down in the center of their webs, possibly in an attempt to look larger and more threatening. This reaction could be due to their response to vibrations in the web when prey is trapped. Barn spiders shake or sway their webs to instigate further reaction from the prey caught within the web or to confirm that it was debris or other environmental disturbances (fallen leaves, sticks, etc.). They are also able to glean information about the object/insect, through the feel of the web as it shakes. If the spider senses a likely meal has been caught, they move to it and immediately begin wrapping it with silk.

Distribution
They are mostly found in North America in late summer and through autumn.  Barn spiders are most common in the Northeastern United States and the southern prairie parts of Canada.

In popular culture
This spider was made well known in the book Charlotte's Web by American writer E. B. White, with a particularly interesting point that the spider's full name is Charlotte A. Cavatica, a reference to the barn spider's scientific name, Araneus cavaticus.  In addition, one of Charlotte's daughters, after asking what her mother's middle initial was, names herself Aranea.

References

External links

Araneidae
Spiders of North America